Hyloxalus vertebralis is a species of frog in the family Dendrobatidae. It is endemic to southern Ecuador and occurs in the inter-Andean valleys and on the western slopes of the Andes.
Its natural habitats are cloud forests, ponds in open areas, and streams. It is threatened by habitat loss, though its recent decline is probably caused by chytridiomycosis.

References

vertebralis
Amphibians of the Andes
Amphibians of Ecuador
Endemic fauna of Ecuador
Amphibians described in 1899
Taxonomy articles created by Polbot